Holy War of the Seven Khojas was a revolt against the Qing dynasty of China, which broke out in 1847 during the reign of the Daoguang Emperor. The revolt was led by seven Muslim leaders, including Walī Khan, Katta Khan, Kichik Khan and Tawakkul Khoja. The rebels, backed by Kokand Khanate, attacked on Kashgar, Yarkand and Yangi Hisar. The revolt was unsuccessful, but it could in some ways be seen as the initial stages of the uprisings against Qing rule in Altishahr.

References 

1840s conflicts
History of Xinjiang
Islam in Kyrgyzstan
Uyghurs
Jihad
Wars involving the Qing dynasty
Conflicts in 1847